The  in Greek mythology are five malevolent spirits who plagued the craftsman potter:
 Syntribos (a.k.a. Suntribus) — the shatterer (shatter, crush)
 Smaragos (a.k.a. Smaragus) — the smasher (smash, crash)
 Asbetos (a.k.a. Asbetus) — the charrer (char, scorch)
 Sabaktes (a.k.a. Sabactes) — the destroyer (shatter, destroy)
 Omodamos (a.k.a. Omodamus) — crudebake

See also
 List of Greek mythological figures

References

External links
 Homer's Epigrams at adelaide.edu.au .

Greek gods
Ancient Greek pottery
Athena in art
Curses 
Ancient Greek literature
Evil gods